Adi Gafni is an Israeli sprint canoer who competed in the early 2000s. She won a bronze medal in the K-2 1000 m event at the 2002 ICF Canoe Sprint World Championships in Seville.

References

Israeli female canoeists
Living people
Year of birth missing (living people)
ICF Canoe Sprint World Championships medalists in kayak